Eynabad (also Romanized as ‘Eynābād; also known as Qal‘eh-ye Āqā Beyk) is a village in Hayaquq-e Nabi Rural District, in the Central District of Tuyserkan County, Hamadan Province, Iran. At the 2006 census, its population was 1,388, in 390 families.

References 

Populated places in Tuyserkan County